Sandro Salvini (1890–1955) was an Italian actor. He appeared in around thirty films during the silent and sound eras. He played the lead role of the Duke in Alessandro Blasetti's Mother Earth (1931). His grandfather was the 19th century Italian stage tragedian Tommaso Salvini.

Selected filmography
 The Thirteenth Man (1917)
 The Conqueror of the World (1919)
 Countess Sarah (1919)
 The Cheerful Soul (1919)
 The Fall of the Curtain (1920)
 The Serpent (1920)
 Little Sister (1921)
 The Stronger Passion (1921)
 Nero (1922)
 The Shepherd King (1923)
 Mother Earth (1931)
 Lorenzino de' Medici (1935)
 Kean (1940)

References

Bibliography
 Landy, Marcia. The Folklore of Consensus: Theatricality in the Italian Cinema, 1930-1943. SUNY Press, 28 May 1998.

External links

1890 births
1955 deaths
Italian male film actors
Italian male silent film actors
Italian male stage actors
People from Pisa
20th-century Italian male actors